Arada (Amharic: አራዳ ክፍለ ከተማ) is a district of Addis Ababa, Ethiopia. As of 2011 its population was of 226,000. Arada is one of 10 districts of Addis Ababa, the capital of Ethiopia. Arada is a center of culture and education, with a great number of schools, cultural establishments and annual cultural events. Arada is one of the oldest parts of Addis Ababa and early history is most apparent. Its narrow, sloping streets are dotted with beautiful old one- and two-storey buildings variously adorned with verandas, pillars, bay windows and other decorations in accordance with Indian, Middle-Eastern and European styles. Despite that, there are newer areas. The district's heart is Piazza (pronounced Piassa), a bustling commercial area centered on De Gaulle Square; the imposing city hall, the seat of the city government, built in 1965, and the octagonal neoclassical St Georges Cathedral (Ethiopian Orthodox), built to commemorate Emperor Menelik's defeat of the Italians in the battle of Adwa in 1896 and named after Ethiopia's patron saint Its bustling streets are dotted with stores and boutiques offering European clothing, jewelry, and a variety of other things at relatively greater rates than in other sections of the city.

Geography
The district is located in the northern area of the city, nearby the centre. It borders with the districts of Gullele, Yeka, Kirkos, Lideta and Addis Ketema.

Main sights
Arada is known as the center of the old and the new generation artistic, social and urban life style. Its main sights include St. George's Cathedral, the great Menelik II Square, the Hager Fikir Theatre, the Taitu Hotel, Charles de Gaulle Square and many other historical areas and structures.

Education

Public education is free at primary, secondary, and tertiary levels. Overall, Ethiopia has made good progress in education of the years. Istituto Statale Italiano Omnicomprensivo di Addis Abeba, an international school operated by the Italian government, is in Arada. Prominent church affiliated schools like Lideta Catholic Catedral School and Nazareth School also reside in this subcity.

List of places
 Adwa Dildiy Akebabi

Admin Level: 11
 Abacoran Sefer
 Ambassador
 Amist Kilo
 Arat Kilo
 Aroge Kera
 Atekelet Tera
 Bias Meberat
 Doro Manekiya
 Enqulal Faberika
 Eri Bekentu
 Gedam Sefer
 Giorgis
 Habte Giorgis
 Piazza
 Posta Bet
 Ras Mekonnen Deldiy
 Sebara Babur
 Shola
 Somali Tera
 Taliyan Sefer
 Webe Berha
 Yohannes

See also
Yekatit 12 Square
St. George's Cathedral

References

External links

Districts of Addis Ababa